Francis Thomas Sullivan (June 17, 1908 December 17, 1975), known professionally as Frank Sully, was an American film actor. He appeared in over 240 films between 1934 and 1968. Today's audiences know him best as the dumb detective in the Boston Blackie features, and as the foil in many Three Stooges comedies.

Career
After working on the vaudeville stage, Sully entered the film industry in 1934. He played small parts and bits for several years at various studios, usually as tough guys. Gradually he was cast in higher-budgeted features, including Another Thin Man (1939) where Sully plays one of Nick Charles's streetwise pals, and John Ford's The Grapes of Wrath (1940) with Sully cast as Noah Joad, whose family treks across America for a new life.

Sully's first major role came in 1941 for Monogram Pictures, a "budget" studio that often gave opportunities to ambitious actors. In the Frankie Darro campus comedy Let's Go Collegiate, Sully was featured as a dumb truck driver recruited to masquerade as a star athlete. The role gave Sully good exposure, and the actor received excellent notices. The Exhibitor noted that "Sully takes acting honors, with Darro, (Keye) Luke, and (Jackie) Moran very good in their roles."

In 1942 Sully signed with Columbia Pictures. The studio had a company policy of casting its contract players in as many films as possible, regardless of class or budget, and Sully kept busy in dozens of Columbia's feature films, series comedies, westerns, and short subjects. When the studio's series of Boston Blackie comedy-mysteries needed a new sidekick for detective inspector Farraday (Richard Lane), Sully was recruited and remained in the role of the slow-witted "Matthews" until the end of the series in 1949.

In 1943 Sully began working in Columbia's two-reel comedy unit, where he remained a familiar presence off and on through 1957. He supported star comedians Hugh Herbert, Vera Vague, Slim Summerville, Wally Vernon and Eddie Quillan, Joe Besser, and most memorably The Three Stooges. Sully is featured in such Stooge comedies as Fling in the Ring, Pardon My Backfire, and Guns a Poppin!. He is most prominent in A Merry Mix Up as the bewildered waiter who thinks he's seeing triple; Sully also narrates the film.

Television
In addition to his film work, Sully also had bit parts in several television shows. Credits include Maverick, The Alfred Hitchcock Hour, Leave It to Beaver, I Love Lucy and The Beverly Hillbillies and "Charley" on Topper. Sully also had a recurring role as Danny the bartender on The Virginian.

Death
Sully died on December 17, 1975, at the Motion Picture & Television Country House and Hospital. He is buried in Forest Lawn Memorial Park in Long Beach, California.

Selected filmography

 Caravan (1934) .... Hungarian Soldier (uncredited)
 Murder at the Vanities (1934) .... Chorus Boy (uncredited)
 365 Nights in Hollywood (1934) .... Mr. Sully, Student Actor (uncredited)
 Alibi Ike (1935) .... Ball Player (uncredited)
 Fighting Youth (1935) .... Football Player from St. Louis
 Mary Burns, Fugitive (1935) .... Steve
 Follow the Fleet (1936) .... Sailor (uncredited)
 Gentle Julia (1936) .... Mr. Toms
 Small Town Girl (1936) .... Bill (uncredited)
 Fury (1936) .... Dynamiter (uncredited)
 Poppy (1936) .... Bit part (uncredited)
 We Went to College (1936) .... Student as Othello (uncredited)
 Rhythm on the Range (1936) .... Splashed Rodeo Cowboy (uncredited)
 Theodora Goes Wild (1936) .... Clarence (uncredited)
 Black Legion (1937) .... Truck Driver's Helper (uncredited)
 Criminals of the Air (1937) .... Contact (uncredited)
 They Gave Him a Gun (1937) .... Comedy Soldier (uncredited)
 Captains Courageous (1937) .... Taxi Driver (uncredited)
 Riding on Air (1937) .... Harrison's Truck Driver (uncredited)
 High, Wide and Handsome (1937) .... Gabby Johnson (uncredited)
 White Bondage (1937) .... Man in Pool Room (uncredited)
 Life Begins in College (1937) .... Acting Captain
 Radio Patrol (1937) .... Flynn (uncredited)
 That's My Story (1937) .... Reporter (uncredited)
 Live, Love and Learn (1937) .... Marine (uncredited)
 Daughter of Shanghai (1937) .... Jake Kelly (uncredited)
 White Banners (1938) .... Butcher's Delivery Man (uncredited)
 Start Cheering (1938) .... Jimmy - Student Accosting Jean (uncredited)
 Test Pilot (1938) .... Pilot in Cafe (uncredited)
 The Crowd Roars (1938) .... Harry - Second Croquet Player (uncredited)
 Hold That Co-ed (1938) .... Steve
 Youth Takes a Fling (1938) .... Jim (uncredited)
 His Exciting Night (1938) .... Milk Truck Driver (uncredited)
 Thanks for Everything (1938) .... Lem Slininger
 Newsboys' Home (1938) .... Assistant to Hartley (uncredited)
 The Great Man Votes (1939) .... Policeman at Parade (uncredited)
 Society Lawyer (1939) .... First Cab Driver (uncredited)
 Sorority House (1939) .... The Caterer (uncredited)
 Some Like It Hot (1939) .... Sailor Burke / The Living Corpse
 Second Fiddle (1939) .... Townsman (uncredited)
 Mickey the Kid (1939) .... Curly (uncredited)
 Another Thin Man (1939) .... Pete - a Father (uncredited)
 The Night of Nights (1939) .... Taxi Driver (uncredited)
 The Grapes of Wrath (1940) .... Noah Joad
 The Fighting 69th (1940) .... Sergeant (uncredited)
 Castle on the Hudson (1940) .... Second Prisoner (uncredited)
 Women Without Names (1940) .... Friendly Motorist (uncredited)
 The Doctor Takes a Wife (1940) .... Slapcovitch
 Lillian Russell (1940) .... Hank
 Escape to Glory (1940) .... Tommy Malone
 I Can't Give You Anything But Love, Baby (1940) .... Henchman Wilky (uncredited)
 Cross-Country Romance (1940) .... Mike (motorcycle cop #2)
 The Return of Frank James (1940) .... Actor
 Young People (1940) .... Jeb
 He Stayed for Breakfast (1940) .... Butcher
 Yesterday's Heroes (1940) .... Curly Walsh
 City for Conquest (1940) .... Radio Listener (uncredited)
 Spring Parade (1940) .... Bert - Shawl Salesman (uncredited)
 Street of Memories (1940) .... Elliott (uncredited)
 Dr. Kildare's Crisis (1940) .... John Root (uncredited)
 Golden Hoofs (1941) .... Ed Muckle (uncredited)
 Nice Girl? (1941) .... Jake (uncredited)
 Murder Among Friends (1941) .... Service Station Attendant (uncredited)
 A Girl, a Guy, and a Gob (1941) .... Salty
 Double Date (1941) .... Hank
 The Flame of New Orleans (1941) .... Oyster Bed Cafe Waiter (uncredited)
 She Knew All the Answers (1941) .... Cop
 Mountain Moonlight (1941) .... Bill Jackson
 Private Nurse (1941) .... Eddie
 Let's Go Collegiate (1941) .... Hercules 'Herk' Bevans
 You'll Never Get Rich (1941) .... Robert's Guard (uncredited)
 The Body Disappears (1941) .... Rest Home Attendant (uncredited)
 You're in the Army Now (1941) .... Hog Caller (uncredited)
 All Through the Night (1942) .... Spence
 Sleepytime Gal (1942) .... Dimples
 Rings on Her Fingers (1942) .... Taxi Driver
 True to the Army (1942) .... Mugg
 To the Shores of Tripoli (1942) .... Truck Driver (uncredited)
 Two Yanks in Trinidad (1942) .... Mike Paradise
 Inside the Law (1942) .... Jim Burke
 Yankee Doodle Dandy (1942) .... Army Recruiter (uncredited)
 Parachute Nurse (1942) .... Sgt. Peters
 The Talk of the Town (1942) .... Policeman in Station Wagon (uncredited)
 A Man's World (1942) .... Sammy Collins
 My Sister Eileen (1942) .... Jenson
 Lucky Legs (1942) .... Mugg (uncredited)
 Daring Young Man (1942) .... Luke
 The Boogie Man Will Get You (1942) .... Police Officer Joe Starrett (uncredited)
 Laugh Your Blues Away (1942) .... Buck
 One Dangerous Night (1943) .... Hertzog - Henchman
 Power of the Press (1943) .... Mack Gibbons (uncredited)
 They Got Me Covered (1943) .... Red
 Murder in Times Square (1943) .... Benny the Baboon (Snake Exhibit Owner) (uncredited)
 Redhead from Manhattan (1943) .... Henchman (uncredited)
 The More the Merrier (1943) .... FBI Agent Pike
 It's a Great Life (1943) .... Elevator Starter (uncredited)
 Two Señoritas from Chicago (1943) .... Bruiser
 Good Luck, Mr. Yates (1943) .... Joe Briggs
 Thousands Cheer (1943) .... Alan
 Dangerous Blondes (1943) .... Detective Joe Henderson
 There's Something About a Soldier (1943) .... Alex Grybinski
 The Ghost That Walks Alone (1944) .... Beppo
 "Bachelor Daze" (1944, Short) .... Ezra's neighbor
 Two Girls and a Sailor (1944) .... Private Adams
 Secret Command (1944) .... Shawn
 Boston Blackie Booked on Suspicion (1945) .... Sergeant Matthews
 Boston Blackie's Rendezvous (1945) .... Detective Sgt. Matthews
 Along Came Jones (1945) .... Avery de Longpre
 I Love a Bandleader (1945) .... Dan Benson
 Out of the Depths (1945) .... 'Speed' Brogan
 One Way to Love (1946) .... Hopkins
 A Close Call for Boston Blackie (1946) .... Sergeant Matthews
 The Gentleman Misbehaves (1946) .... Taxi Driver
 Throw a Saddle on a Star (1946) .... Lawyer
 Talk About a Lady (1946) .... Rocky Jordan
 The Phantom Thief (1946) .... Detective Sergeant Matthews
 Renegades (1946) .... Link
 Dangerous Business (1946) .... Bert
 It's Great to Be Young (1946) .... Burkett
 Crime Doctor's Man Hunt (1946) .... Rigger
 Boston Blackie and the Law (1946) .... Sergeant Matthews
 South of the Chisholm Trail (1947) .... Big Jim Grady (uncredited)
 Wild Harvest (1947) .... Nick
 Trapped by Boston Blackie (1948) .... Sgt. Matthews
 Blondie's Reward (1948) .... Officer Carney
 Let's Live a Little (1948) .... Artist (uncredited)
 Gun Smugglers (1948) .... Corporal Clancy
 Boston Blackie's Chinese Venture (1949) .... Detective Sergeant Matthews
 Joe Palooka in the Counterpunch (1949) .... Looie
 Trapped (1949) .... Sam - Bartender (uncredited)
 Tell It to the Judge (1949) .... Waiter (uncredited)
 Bodyhold (1949) .... 'Killer' Cassidy
 Joe Palooka Meets Humphrey (1950) .... Looie
 Blondie's Hero (1950) .... Mike McClusky, the Snorer (uncredited)
 Killer Shark (1950) .... Patrick - bartender (uncredited)
 The Good Humor Man (1950) .... Cop (uncredited)
 Square Dance Katy (1950) .... Workman
 Beauty on Parade (1950) .... Murph
 The Reformer and the Redhead (1950) .... Joe - Cop with Blackeye (uncredited)
 Joe Palooka in Humphrey Takes a Chance (1950) .... Looie
 When You're Smiling (1950) .... Cab Driver (uncredited)
 Rookie Fireman (1950) .... Charlie
 Watch the Birdie (1950) .... Street Construction Workman (uncredited)
 Prairie Roundup (1951) .... Sheriff (uncredited)
 Father's Little Dividend (1951) .... Infant Service Diaper Man (uncredited)
 The Big Gusher (1951) .... Barfly (uncredited)
 Rich, Young and Pretty (1951) .... Legionnaire (uncredited)
 The Tall Target (1951) .... Telegram Messenger (uncredited)
 Rhubarb (1951) .... Big Head Charlie - Bookie (uncredited)
 The People Against O'Hara (1951) .... Fishmonger (uncredited)
 The Red Badge of Courage (1951) .... Veteran (uncredited)
 Behave Yourself! (1951) .... Bill's Taxi Driver (uncredited)
 Let's Make It Legal (1951) .... Laborer (uncredited)
 Man in the Saddle (1951) .... Lee Repp
 I Want You (1951) .... Bartender (uncredited)
 Mutiny (1952) .... Crewman (uncredited)
 The Sniper (1952) .... Man at Carnival Dunking Concession (uncredited)
 Night Stage to Galveston (1952) .... Policeman Kelly
 With a Song in My Heart (1952) .... Vociferous Texan G.I. (uncredited)
 No Room for the Groom (1952) .... Cousin Luke
 Young Man with Ideas (1952) .... Salesman (uncredited)
 The Girl in White (1952) .... Pool Player (uncredited)
 Pat and Mike (1952) .... Photographer (uncredited)
 Washington Story (1952) .... Bystander (uncredited)
 Rainbow 'Round My Shoulder (1952) .... Harry (uncredited)
 Down Among the Sheltering Palms (1953) .... Sergeant (uncredited)
 Man in the Dark (1953) .... Yellow Cab Driver (uncredited)
 Take Me to Town (1953) .... Sammy - Stagehand (uncredited)
 Northern Patrol (1953) .... Bartender
 Pardon My Backfire (1953, Short) .... Algernon, Escaped Convict
 Bad for Each Other (1953) .... Tippy Kashko, Townsman
 The Battle of Rogue River (1954) .... Pvt. Kohler
 Loophole (1954) .... Charlie - Cab Driver (uncredited)
 Massacre Canyon (1954) .... Army Private (uncredited)
 Silver Lode (1954) .... Paul Herbert, Telegrapher
 The Law vs. Billy the Kid (1954) .... Deputy Jack Poe (uncredited)
 Fling in the Ring (1955, Short) .... Big Mike
 Women's Prison (1955) .... Frank, Turnkey (uncredited)
 Wyoming Renegades (1955) .... Williams (uncredited)
 The Man from Bitter Ridge (1955) .... Billy Bundy (uncredited)
 Jungle Moon Men (1955) .... Max
 Seminole Uprising (1955) .... Sergeant (uncredited)
 Bring Your Smile Along (1955) .... Call Boy (uncredited)
 Apache Ambush (1955) .... Pioneer (uncredited)
 The Naked Street (1955) .... Nutsy (uncredited)
 Blunder Boys (1955, Short) .... Watts D. Matter (uncredited)
 The Tender Trap (1955) .... Doorman (uncredited)
 Last of the Desperados (1955) .... Tim - Murder Victim (uncredited)
 The Spoilers (1955) .... Miner (uncredited)
 Fury at Gunsight Pass (1956) .... Frank (uncredited)
 The Houston Story (1956) .... Taxicab Driver (uncredited)
 Flagpole Jitters (1956, Short) .... Jim (uncredited)
 Frontier Gambler (1956) .... Bartender
 The Unguarded Moment (1956) .... Taxi Driver (uncredited)
 You Can't Run Away from It (1956) .... Red
 Friendly Persuasion (1956) .... Rebel Looter (uncredited)
 The Desperados Are in Town (1956) .... Carl Branch
 A Merry Mix Up (1957, Short) .... Waiter / Narrator (uncredited)
 Guns a Poppin (1957, Short) .... Sheriff
 The Buckskin Lady (1957) .... Jed
 The Helen Morgan Story (1957) .... Vendor (scenes deleted)
 Pal Joey (1957) .... Barker (uncredited)
 Rockabilly Baby (1957) .... Bum
 Domino Kid (1957) .... Red - Bartender (uncredited)
 The Female Animal (1958) .... Taxicab Driver (uncredited)
 Return to Warbow (1958) .... Bartender (uncredited)
 Man from God's Country (1958) .... Trail Cook (uncredited)
 The Last Hurrah (1958) .... Fire Lieutenant (uncredited)
 The Gunfight at Dodge City (1959) .... Drunken Cowboy Who Throws Bottle (uncredited)
 Let No Man Write My Epitaph (1960) .... Drunk at Bar (uncredited)
 Gypsy (1962) .... Wichita Burlesque Audience Member (uncredited)
 The Virginian (1963 episode "Echo of Another Day) .... Danny
 Bye Bye Birdie (1963) .... Maude's Bartender (uncredited)
 Zebra in the Kitchen (1965) .... Motorist Surrounded by Elephants (uncredited)
 Alvarez Kelly (1966) .... Prisoner (uncredited)
 Funny Girl (1968) .... Bartender (uncredited) (final film role)

References

External links

1908 births
1975 deaths
American male film actors
Male actors from St. Louis
20th-century American male actors
American male television actors
20th-century American comedians
Burials at Forest Lawn Memorial Park (Long Beach)